Estonia has an embassy in Moscow as well as a consulate-general in Saint Petersburg and another consulate mission in Pskov. The following is a list of ambassadors of Estonia to Russia.

Envoys to the Soviet Union
1921-1922 - Tõnis Vares
1922-1926 - Ado Birk
1926-1928 - Heinrich Laretei
1928-1933 - Julius Seljamaa
1933-1936 - Karl Tofer
1936-1937 - August Traksmaa
1938-1940 - August Rei

Ambassadors to the Russian Federation
1992-1995 - Jüri Kahn
1995-1999 - Mart Helme
1999-2001 - Tiit Matsulevitš
2001-2005 - Karin Jaani
2005-2008 - Marina Kaljurand
2008-2012 - Simmu Tiik
2012-2015 - Jüri Luik
2015-2018 - Arti Hilpus
2018-2023 - Margus Laidre

References
 Estonian Embassy in Russia
 
Estonia
Russia